Juan Bueno Torio (born Córdoba, Veracruz, 1953) is a Mexican politician that was affiliated with the National Action Party between 1994 and December 2015. He was a Senator representing the State of Veracruz for the period 2006 to 2012.

Political career
Juan Bueno Torio has a bachelor's degree in Business Administration granted by the National Autonomous University of Mexico, Federal Deputy at the LVII Legislature of the Mexican Congress, in which he presided the Patrimony and Industrial Foment Commission, member of the electoral campaign of Vicente Fox and Under-Secretary of Small and Medium Companies of the Secretariat of Economy from 2000 to 2003.

From 2003 to 2006 he was designated by President Fox as General Director of PEMEX Refinación, position to which he resigned in order to pursue the position of Senator, having been elected for the LX Legislature in the 2006 Federal Election.

External links
Official Website
Juan Bueno Torio in the Official Website of the Mexican Senate

References

Living people
1953 births
National Action Party (Mexico) politicians
Members of the Senate of the Republic (Mexico)
Members of the Chamber of Deputies (Mexico)
20th-century Mexican politicians
21st-century Mexican politicians
Politicians from Veracruz
People from Córdoba, Veracruz
National Autonomous University of Mexico alumni